Six Sigma Plus is a Pakistani independent film and television production company. The company was founded by actor Humayun Saeed and Shahzad Nasib. This company also co-produces TV dramas with Next Level Entertainment.

Six Sigma Plus Entertainment Company was formed because besides acting, Saeed wanted to make projects on his own.

Current productions

Former productions

Films
 Dil Mera Dhadkan Teri (2013)
 Abhi Tou Main Jawan Hoon (2013)
 Main Hoon Shahid Afridi (2013)
 Jawani Phir Nahi Ani (2015)
 Isteqamat (2016)
 Punjab Nahi Jaungi (2017)
 Jawani Phir Nahi Ani 2 (2018)
 London Nahi Jaunga (2022)

Television

References

 
Television production companies of Pakistan
Film production companies of Pakistan